The Metropolitan Opera House was a historic opera house located in Saint Paul, Minnesota located at 100 East Sixth Street. Plans to build the house began after the Grand Opera House burned down on January 21, 1889. Initial plans for the house were designed by Leroy Buffington, but his plans were abandoned due to insufficient funds. Business tycoon Robert Mannheimer eventually came to the rescue, providing half a million dollars towards the project. New plans by Charles A. Reed were used for the house which was built over a few months in 1890. The opera house opened for business that year and served as Saint Paul's opera venue until 1936.

References

Music venues completed in 1890
Opera houses in Minnesota
Culture of Saint Paul, Minnesota
Theatres completed in 1890